John Cummins is an Irish Fine Gael politician who has served as a Senator for the Labour Panel since April 2020.

Political career
Cummins was elected to Waterford City Council in 2009. In 2010, he was elected as Chairman of the South East Regional Authority. He served his first term as Mayor of Waterford in 2013; at the age of 25, he was the youngest person ever to hold that office. He was subsequently re-elected to the amalgamated Waterford City and County Council in 2014, and served his second term as Mayor in 2015/16. He was re-elected in 2019. 

Cummins unsuccessfully contested the 2020 general election in the Waterford constituency. He was subsequently elected in the 2020 Seanad election as a Senator for the Labour Panel.

He was appointed as the Fine Gael Spokesperson on Housing, Local Government and Heritage by Leo Varadkar.

He lost the party whip in August 2020 following his involvement in the Oireachtas Golf Society scandal. The party whip was restored on 
12 January 2021. All charges related to the event were later dismissed on 3 February 2022.

References

External links
John Cummins' page on the Fine Gael website

Living people
Fine Gael senators
Members of the 26th Seanad
People from County Waterford
Local councillors in County Waterford
Year of birth missing (living people)
Alumni of the University of Limerick